A ruby jubilee marks a 40th  anniversary.

Ruby jubilees in recent history

See also 

 Hierarchy of precious substances
 List of longest-reigning monarchs
 Wedding anniversary

References

Anniversaries